Forbidden Ground, also known as Battle Ground in the United States, is a 2013 Australian action drama film, starring Johan Earl, Tim Pocock, and Martin Copping, set against the backdrop of World War I. It was written by Earl, Denai Gracie, and Travis Spiteri, and directed by Earl and Adrian Powers.

Plot

The films tells the story of three British soldiers during World War I, on the Western Front in 1916. During an abortive assault on the German trenches the three become trapped in no man's land as night falls. One of the soldiers is seriously wounded and requires urgent medical attention.

Another soldier knows that a massive artillery bombardment is due to begin soon and staying where they are would result in certain death. The three begin a retreat back to the Allied trenches pursued by the ever-watchful German soldiers who suspect that another attack is imminent.

During the journey, there are a number of flashbacks to England and the soldiers' private lives, which are discussed at various times. Also along the way, they encounter many obstacles.

See also
Battleground (disambiguation)
List of Australian films

References

External links
 

2013 films
Australian action films
Western Front (World War I) films
Australian World War I films
Australian war drama films
2010s English-language films
2010s Australian films